Science Hat Artistic Cube Moral Nosebleed Empire is an album by Country Teasers which compiles songs from seven-inch singles with home recordings and studio out-takes.

LP track listing 
All songs by B.R. Wallers except where noted

Side one
"Getaway!"
"I Get Hard"
"I'm a New Person, Ma'am"
"We Had to Tear This Motherfucker Up" (Ice Cube)
"Kill!"
"$4.99"
"Happy Feet"
"No Limits" (2 Unlimited)
"Loose Tongues Get into Tight Places"
"Thank God I'm Gone"

Side two
"Let's Have a Shambles"
"After One Thing"
"So Lonely"
"Compressor"
"Can't Sing"
"Tights"
"Go Down Mighty Devil"
"Some Hole"
"Postman Pak and His Lazy Black & White Cunts"
"Kenny Malcolm on Smack"

Side three
"Good Pair of Hands"
"Demon Eyes"
"Trendy Mick Fleetwood's Fast Tail"
"Son of Treble-Faced Man"
"Only Whittlin'"
"Hat on the Bed"
"Julie Halard"
"Only a Woman"
"Sickening Lack"
"Prettiest Slave on the Barge"
"Retainer"

Side four
"Mollusc in Country" (Mark E. Smith/Craig Leon)
"Tough Luck on Jock"
"Treble Life #2"
"The Last Bridge of Spencer Smith"
"Adam Wakes Up"
"Small Shark in Tiny Pool"
"Secrets in Welsh"
"Prettiest Slave on the Barge (reprise)"

CD track listing 
"Compressor" – 1:23
"Getaway!" – 1:39
"Some Hole" – 3:02
"I'm a New Person, Ma'am" – 4:13
"$4.99" – 2:25
"Mollusc in Country" – 1:25
"Happy Feet" – 2:51
"No Limits" – 1:52
"Hat on the Bed" – 2:10
"Secrets in Welsh" – 4:18
"Adam Wakes Up" – 2:05
"Loose Tongues Get into Tight Places" – 2:23
"After One Thing" – 2:20
"Treble Life #2" – 1:22
"The Last Bridge of Spencer Smith" – 4:54
"Can't Sing" – 1:18
"We Had to Tear This Motherfucker Up" – 2:12
"Only Whittlin'" – 1:59
"Postman Pak and His Lazy Black & White Cunts" – 4:07
"Tough Luck on Jock" – 7:10

2002 compilation albums
Country Teasers albums